Godigisel (359–406) was King of the Hasdingi Vandals until his death in 406. It is unclear when or how he became king; however, in 405 he formed and led a coalition of Germanic peoples, including the Hasdingi Vandals, Silingi Vandals, Suebi, and others from Pannonia with the intention of invading Roman Gaul. Before crossing the Rhine River into Gaul, he was killed in the Vandal–Frankish war, possibly in late 406. Shortly after his death (traditionally dated to 31 December 406), this group of Vandals and their allies crossed the Rhine River into the territory of the Roman Empire, possibly while it was frozen.

Godigisel was succeeded by his eldest surviving son, Gunderic, who led the Vandals into Gaul and in October 409 to Hispania. But Godigisel was best known as the father of Genseric, who succeeded Gunderic to the kingship in 428 and ruled for 49 years, establishing a powerful kingdom in North Africa.

Notes

359 births
406 deaths
Kings of the Vandals
Vandal warriors
Monarchs killed in action
5th-century monarchs in Europe
4th-century monarchs in Europe